San Alberto is Spanish for Saint Albert, it may also refer to;

San Alberto, Cesar, a town in Colombia
San Alberto, Costa Rica, a town in Costa Rica
San Alberto Department, a department in Argentina
San Alberto, Paraguay, a town in Paraguay